The New Testament was originally written in Koine Greek, an Indo-European language, and Bible translations into this large and influential language family have been produced since classical times.

Albanian

Armenian

Baltic

Latvian

Lithuanian

Celtic

Germanic

Greek

Indo-Iranian

Italic 
The Italic languages are the subfamily of Indo-European incorporating the Romance languages and derived from Latin language, itself considered Latino-Faliscan language.

Romance languages

Slavic 

Indo
Indo-European languages